Journal amusant was a French weekly satirical magazine published from 1856 until 1933. It was founded by the caricaturist, journalist, and publisher Charles Philipon. 

The magazine's immediate predecessor was Journal pour rire which Philipon had founded in 1849. In 1856, he replaced it with Journal amusant and simultaneously started Petit Journal pour rire for his friend Nadar to edit, although Nadar was to contribute to both publications. The original format of Journal amusant was 8 pages and consisted primarily of cartoons and caricatures satirizing the social mores of the day. Lighter in tone than Le Charivari (also founded by Philipon), its editorial content was largely focused on the theatre and fashion rather than politics.

Following Charles Philipon's death in 1862, the journal was managed by his son Eugène until his own death in 1874. Pierre Véron then took over as editor-in-chief. In 1899, shortly before Véron's retirement, its format changed to 16 pages with a front page in colour. Publication of the journal ceased during World War I and resumed in May 1919. The last issue of Journal amusant was published in 1933 by which time its title was Le journal amusant et Gai Paris réunis reflecting its takeover of the magazine Gai Paris in 1931.

Contributors
Artists who contributed to Journal amusant include:

Draner 
André Gill
Alfred Grévin
Paul Hadol
Pierre-Georges Jeanniot
Nadar
Gaston Noury
Henri Pille
Albert Robida
Sacha Zaliouk

References

External links
Issues of Journal amusant from 1856 to 1933 scanned by the Bibliothèque nationale de France

1856 establishments in France
1933 disestablishments in France
Defunct magazines published in France
French-language magazines
Satirical magazines published in France
Magazines established in 1856
Magazines disestablished in 1933
Magazines published in Paris